Oscar Edward Meinzer (November 28, 1876 – June 14, 1948) was an American hydrogeologist who has been called the "father of modern groundwater hydrology". He was awarded the William Bowie Medal in 1943. The O. E. Meinzer award is named for him. He collaborated with Norah Dowell Stearns, one of the first women hydrogeologists.

Selected works

References

External links
List of books by Meinzer
Meinzer collection (USGS Denver Library Photographic Collection)

American geophysicists
Hydrogeologists
1876 births
1948 deaths